Sonya Lamonakis (born October 7, 1974, Greece) is a Greek American boxer and New York City school teacher. Lamonakis is ranked formally no.1 in the women's heavyweight division in the World Boxing Council. Lamonakis is a former IBO World Heavyweight Champion.
Sonya Lamonakis’s net worth is approximately $1.9 million.

Professional Boxing Titles
USA New York State female heavyweight title (229 Ibs)
IBO World female heavyweight title

Professional boxing record

References

External links
 

1974 births
Living people
American women boxers
Heavyweight boxers
American people of Greek descent
World boxing champions
Boxers from New York (state)
21st-century American women